Karl Gutenberger (18 April 1905 - 8 July 1961) was a Nazi Party politician, SS-Obergruppenführer and General of the Waffen-SS and the Police. He was Police President in Duisburg and Essen and was the Higher SS and Police Leader "West." After the end of the Second World War, he was sentenced to prison for war crimes.

Early life
Karl Gutenberger was the son of a manager of the Krupp factory in Essen. After volksschule, he attended the oberrealschule and the realgymnasium in Altenessen. From 1921 and 1923 he completed a bank apprenticeship and then became a bank clerk, working in banking and business, including at Rheinstahl AG, a steel manufacturer in Essen, where he worked as a finance clerk from 1928 to 1929. He also worked briefly for a newspaper, the National-Zeitung from 1930 to 1931.

Gutenberger was active in the Nazi Party very early on, joining it in 1923 and again in mid-December 1925 (membership number 25,249) after the ban imposed on the Party in the wake of the Beer Hall Putsch was lifted. He became the Ortsgruppenleiter (Local Group Leader) for the district of Siegeroth in Essen and also worked as a Party speaker. On 31 July 1932, he was elected to the Reichstag from electoral constituency 23 (Düsseldorf-West), until it was dissolved that November. He was then elected to the Prussian Landtag in November 1932, serving until that body was abolished following the Nazi seizure of power. He then returned as a Reichstag deputy from November 1933 until the end of the Nazi regime in 1945. He was a recipient of the Golden Party Badge.

SA and SS career
A member of the Sturmabteilung (SA) since 1925, on 15 September 1932, Gutenberger was made an SA-Standartenführer and led  numerous SA regiments. Promoted to SA-Oberführer in November 1933, he then commanded SA brigades in Wesel and Duisburg. From May 1937 he served as Police President (chief of police) of the city of Duisburg. On 14 November 1939, he left Duisburg to become Police President of Essen, holding this office until May 1941. On 1 June 1940, he left the SA and joined the SS (SS number 372,303) with the rank of SS-Brigadeführer. On 29 June 1941 he succeeded Friedrich Jeckeln as both Higher SS and Police Leader "West" and Leader  of SS-Oberabschnittt (Main District) "West" with his headquarters in Düsseldorf. His jurisdiction comprised most of the northern Rhineland and Westphalia. He would retain both posts until the end of the Second World War.

Guttenberger was promoted to SS-Gruppenführer and Generalleutnant of Police on 9 November 1942. This was followed on 1 August 1944 by advancement to Obergruppenführer and General of the Waffen-SS and the Police. From November 1944 he was appointed Inspector of Passive Resistance and Special Defense "West", heading the clandestine volunteer Werwolf forces in his jurisdiction. Toward the end of the war he was responsible for numerous extrajudicial murders, including on the instructions of Reichsführer-SS Heinrich Himmler, having the Allied-appointed  Oberbürgermeister (Lord Mayor) of Aachen, Franz Oppenhoff, murdered on 25 March 1945.

Postwar prosecution
After the end of the war, Gutenberger was captured by American forces in Schloss Lopshorn in Lippe and placed in internment from 10 May 1945. On 20 October 1948, a British military court in Hamburg sentenced him to twelve years in prison for the murder of foreign workers. Further trials before German civil courts followed. On 22 October 1949, he received a four-year sentence from an Aachen court for his role in the Oppenhoff murder. A conviction on 16 March 1950 to a five-year prison sentence for crimes against humanity for his part in the murder of Allied airmen who had been shot down was later overturned on appeal in 1952. Due to an amnesty, Gutenberger was released from Werl Prison on 9 May 1953. After his release from prison, he worked in a wholesale business and died in 1961.

External weblink

 Karl Gutenberger in the Westphalia History Internet Portal

References

Sources

1905 births
1961 deaths
German police chiefs
Members of the Reichstag of Nazi Germany
Members of the Reichstag of the Weimar Republic
Nazi Party officials
Nazi Party politicians
Nazis convicted of war crimes
People from Essen
SS and Police Leaders
SS-Obergruppenführer
Sturmabteilung officers
Waffen-SS personnel
German prisoners of war in World War II held by the United States
People convicted in the Curiohaus trials